Leflutrozole (developmental code names BGS-649, CGP-47645) is an aromatase inhibitor which is under development by Mereo BioPharma and Novartis for the treatment of hypogonadism in men. It was also under investigation for the treatment of endometriosis, but development for this indication was discontinued. As of December 2017, leflutrozole is in phase II clinical trials for hypogonadism.

See also
 List of investigational sex-hormonal agents § Estrogenics

References

External links
 Leflutrozole - AdisInsight

Aromatase inhibitors
Experimental drugs
Hormonal antineoplastic drugs
Nitriles
Organofluorides
Progonadotropins
Triazoles